Vastemõisa Parish was a rural municipality of Estonia, in Viljandi County.

The parish existed until 1950. On 19 December 1991 the parish was re-established. On 16 June 2005 the parish was merged with Suure-Jaani Parish.

Populated places

References

Viljandi County
Former municipalities of Estonia